Hejiang is a county in the southeast of Sichuan Province, China, bordering Guizhou province to the south and Chongqing Municipality to the north and northeast. It is under the administration of Luzhou city.

History
Hejiang County has a history over 2100 years. The county was built in 115 BC during the Han Dynasty of China and was one of the three oldest counties in the upper Yangtze river area. Hejiang is one of the nation's counties with more than thousand years history, it was first incorporated as Fu County 115 BC, under the prefecture of Jianwei.

Geography

There are many historical ruin and relics, the Shengbicheng fortress which the song dynasty army withstood the Mongol attack for 34 years; Stone cave shelter in FubaoTown; Han dynasty coffin. Ancient towns, Yaoba and Fuabo are listed as national history and culture towns in 2007 and 2009. Many historical background films and plays were filmed there.

Hejiang's fertile land produces rice and many other grains and plants, especially lychee, the most famous fruit giving from the nature. With the unique climate, weather and rainfall, outputs of lychee there one month or more later than the coastal province of Guangdong, Guangxi, Hainan, and Fujian.

The county bordering with Chongqing Municipality and Guizhou Province, Fubao Nation Forest Park in Hejiang, Simian Mountain in Chongqing's Jiangjin, and Chishui National Scenic Spot in Guizhou, made up the tourism gold corner, highways and tourism infrastructural facilities are under construction. It will be quickly accessible from Chongqing, Luzhou or Guiyang.

The G93 national expressway connected the small city with Chongqing without one hour's journey. Plants are built along the Changjiang river. This land is changing from traditional farming to industry. Inhabitants dwell in the town Hejiang, or the county seat nearly 200,000 already. According to the city-planning of Sichuan, it will be home to more than 300,000 people.

Population
As of 2016, the county had a population of 900,000.

Adjacent county-level divisions
 Chishui City, Guizhousouth
 Xishui County, Guizhousouth
 Longmatan Districtwest
 Naxi Districtwest
 Xuyong Countysouthwest
 Jiangjin District, Chongqingnortheast

Climate

See also
 Luzhou

References

External links
  Hejiang County Government website

 
County-level divisions of Sichuan
Luzhou